The Hopps Open de Provence is a golf tournament on the Challenge Tour. It was first played in September 2018 at Golf International de Pont Royal in Mallemort, Bouches-du-Rhône, France. 

The main sponsor of the tournament is Hopps Group, a French holding company managing six subsidiaries in the field of logistics, postal parcels and door-to-door sales.

Winners

References

External links

Coverage on the Challenge Tour's official site

Challenge Tour events
Golf tournaments in France
2018 establishments in France
Recurring sporting events established in 2018